The Umbrian regional election of 2005 took place on 3–4 April 2005.

Incumbent Maria Rita Lorenzetti (Democrats of the Left, then Democratic Party) defeated Pietro Laffranco (National Alliance) by a landslide to remain as President of Umbria.

Results
Source: Ministry of the Interior

Elections in Umbria
2005 elections in Italy